The Sommerville/Petitt House is a municipally-designated, historic building located in the Nutana neighbourhood of Saskatoon, Saskatchewan, Canada.   The property is a -story, stucco-and-brick house in a blended Tudor Revival and Spanish Revival style constructed in 1912.  Features of the building include a tower topped with a bell-cast dome, a large arched porch with porte-cochere, and a carriage entrance supported by fieldstone pillars.

References 

Buildings and structures in Saskatoon
Houses completed in 1912
1912 establishments in Saskatchewan